Krishan Lal Sharma (1 November 1925–1999) was a leader of Bharatiya Janata Party. He was a member of Lok Sabha from Delhi. He was a member of Rajya Sabha from 1990 to 1996.

References

1999 deaths
India MPs 1996–1997
India MPs 1998–1999
1925 births
Lok Sabha members from Delhi
Bharatiya Jana Sangh politicians
Rajya Sabha members from Himachal Pradesh
Bharatiya Janata Party politicians from Delhi